Tozeur is the westernmost of the 24 governorates (provinces) of Tunisia and as such bordering Algeria. It covers an area of 4,719 km2 and has a population of 107,912 (2014 census) making it the least populated province. The capital is Tozeur.



Geography

The area is of low elevation, particularly its two large dry lakes occupying approximately 45% of its area.  These are about a third of the Chott el Djerid, the country's largest inland body of water/salt pan and the Chott el Rhasa which has a small portion in Algeria.  The lowest point is the bottom of the latter, 23 m below mean sea level. Tozeur and its airstrip are in the quite narrow strip of land between the two pans.  Elevations reach above 200 m in the north east extreme being otherwise below 100 m.  The uplands to the north attract variable winter and early spring relief precipitation and little other rain.  The area exhibits a hot desert climate (Köppen climate classification BWh) with long, extremely hot summers throughout (see North-south graduation of Tunisian climatic zones) — the patchy and infrequent rainfall in winter is greater than the average for the Sahara Desert of which the area forms part.

Transport
One of four arterial roads into Algeria passes through Tozeur along a north-east to south-west axis and the town of Gafsa, a provincial capital to the north before heading due east towards the port and coastal resort city of Sfax.  The other roads of the province are marked as minor, one passing via a long causeway through the Chott el Djerid leading directly to Kebili, Matmata and Medenine.

Administrative divisions
The Tozeur Governorate is divided into five delegations (mutamadiyat), listed below with their populations at the 2004 and 2014 Censuses, and further divided into 36 sectors (imada).

Five municipalities are in Tozeur Governorate:

References

 
Governorates of Tunisia